Nyceryx riscus is a moth of the  family Sphingidae.

Distribution 
It is found from Belize and Mexico to Costa Rica and further south to Bolivia and Argentina.

Description 
The wingspan is 50–58 mm. It is similar to Nyceryx stuarti but smaller and paler. There is an indistinct, grey-centred discal spot and a conspicuous black dot distal of it towards the costa on the forewing upperside.

Biology 
Adults are probably on wing year round.

The larvae feed on mature leaves of Xylophragma seemannianum. They have a solid green tail horn with well-developed bumps. The body is a yellowish or pale green with pale yellow lateral diagonal slashes. The head is pale green with a trace of blue wash.

References

Nyceryx
Moths described in 1890